Peppers (name)  may refer to:

Josh Peppers, American professional basketball player 
Julius Peppers, American NFL defensive end who plays for the Carolina Panthers
Debra Peppers, American television and radio host
Jabrill Peppers, American NFL safety/punt returner who plays for the Cleveland Browns

See also
Pepper (name)
Pepper (disambiguation)
The Peppers, a French male instrumental group
Red Hot Chili Peppers, an American rock band